Cleve Kinley (born January 3, 1984) is a Canadian professional ice hockey defenceman in the Norwegian GET-ligaen.

Awards and honors

External links

Kinley to Attend Amerks Camp

1984 births
Living people
Canadian ice hockey defencemen